Myotubularin-related protein 1 is a protein that in humans is encoded by the MTMR1 gene.

This gene encodes a member of the myotubularin related family of proteins. Members of this family contain the consensus sequence for the active site of protein tyrosine phosphatases. Alternatively spliced variants have been described but their biological validity has not been determined.

References

Further reading